Hiralal Ghasulal Gaekwad  (29 August 1923 – 2 January 2003) was an Indian cricketer who played in one Test match in 1952.

External links
 
Hiralal Gaekwad: The southpaw who lost out to Vinoo Mankad

1923 births
2003 deaths
India Test cricketers
Indian cricketers
Holkar cricketers
Madhya Pradesh cricketers
Madhya Bharat cricketers
East Zone cricketers
Central Zone cricketers
Cricketers from Nagpur